Pau Milà i Fontanals (26 December 1810, Vilafranca del Penedès - 16 January 1883, Barcelona) was a Spanish painter, writer and professor; specializing in art history and aesthetics.

Biography 
He was born to a prosperous family. They promoted the cultural life of their hometown, including amateur theatrical performances, and his first drawing lessons came from the scenographer, . In the latter half of 1826, they moved to Barcelona.

There, he completed his primary education and enrolled at the Escola de la Llotja, in 1833. His short stay there was largely intended as a way of getting a stipend that would allow him to study in Rome. There, he joined with other artists from Catalonia, including Claudi Lorenzale, Pelegrí Clavé and Manuel Vilar. Their devotion to "purity" in art led to comparisons with the German group known as the Nazarenes. He stayed there until 1841; making visits to Venice, Florence, Orvieto and Siena. The drawings he made are preserved at the Reial Acadèmia Catalana de Belles Arts de Sant Jordi.

In 1851, he obtained the title of Professor at the Escola, attached to the architecture department, and he began a campaign to preserve Barcelona's architectural heritage. He held that position for five years, then resigned.

His first major project was in conjunction with the : having the Chapel of Santa Àgata declared a "Bien de Interés Cultural", analyzing its structure (together with Elies Rogent), and beginning restoration. In 1868, the Escola named him an "Honorary Scholar", allowing him to continue his preservation work with the school's support. He was named president of the Comissió in 1877.

References

Further reading 
 Joaquim Bas i Gich, "Pau Milà i Fontanals i Claudi Lorenzale", in: La Neotípia, #81, 1930 (Online)
 Manuel Benach i Torrents, Pablo Milá y Fontanals: gran figura del romanticismo artístico catalán, Vilafranca del Penedès, 1958
 Pilar Vélez, "Pau Milà i Fontanals, capdavanter de l'estètica del Romanticisme conservador", Serra d'Or, #609, 2010 

1810 births
1883 deaths
Artists from Catalonia
Spanish artists
Spanish art critics
Spanish art historians
People from Vilafranca del Penedès